The 5th Critics' Choice Television Awards ceremony, presented by the Broadcast Television Journalists Association (BTJA), honored the best in primetime television programming from June 1, 2014, to May 31, 2015, and was held on May 31, 2015, at The Beverly Hilton in Los Angeles, California. The ceremony was broadcast live on A&E.

The nominations were announced on May 6, 2015. Channelwise, HBO received a total of 27 nominations and FX came in second with 16. On May 13, 2015, Cat Deeley was announced as host. Seth MacFarlane received the Critics' Choice Louis XIII Genius Award.

Winners and nominees
Winners are listed first and highlighted in boldface:

Shows with multiple wins
The following shows received multiple awards:

Shows with multiple nominations
The following shows received multiple nominations:

Presenters

References

2015 television awards
2015 in American television
 005
2015 in Los Angeles
May 2015 events in the United States